The Egyptian Radio and Television Union (ERTU;  Itteh'ad Al-Edhaa'a wa at-Televezyon al-Mis'ri) is the public broadcaster of Egypt, operated by the Egyptian government. It is a member of the European Broadcasting Union.

History 
Egyptian Radio began broadcasting on 31 May 1934 in agreement with the Marconi Company. The General Manager of the station for the period was Said Basha Lotfi who presided over the station from May 1934 to December 1947. In December 1947, the contract with Marconi was suspended in favour of an Egyptian national broadcasting station. The station is known also for its call "This is Cairo" (in Arabic هنا القاهرة pronounced Houna al Qaahira). It is considered the First Program (in Arabic البرنامج الأول) of the ERTU. 

Later on three main new radio channels were added, namely the pan-Arab The Voice of the Arabs (صوت العرب) in 1953, Egyptian Radio's Second Programme (البرنامج الثاني) in 1957 and the pan-Arab Middle East Radio (إذاعة الشرق الأوسط) in 1964. All four stations broadcast on high powered medium wave transmitters covering most of the Middle East and North and East Africa. 
 
Egyptian television began broadcasting six hours daily on 21 July 1960 with a state-run channel that held a monopoly on terrestrial broadcasts.

In 1971 a new decree established the Arab Radio and Television Union, and created four distinct sectors: radio, television, engineering, and finance, each of which had a chairman who reported directly to the minister of information. The name of the Union was changed to the Egyptian Radio and Television Union, the name by which it is still known. Today, its total daily broadcast time on its various channels amounts to 490 hours.

Already in 1950 its predecessor the Egyptian State Broadcasting (الإذاعة الحكومية المصرية) was one of the founding members of the European Broadcasting Union in 1950. After the admittance of the Israel Broadcasting Service in 1958, it cancelled its active memberships, as did the Syrian Broadcasting Services. It was readmitted as an active member 1 January 1985.

Services

Radio

General stations
General Programme Radio (إذاعة البرنامج العام) or Egyptian Radio, established in 1934 as the main channel of the network
Voice of the Arabs (إذاعة صوت العرب) established in 1953 as a pan-Arab station
The Second Program (البرنامج الثاني) established in 1957
Now replaced and converted into the Cultural Radio (إذاعة البرنامج الثقافي)
Middle East Radio (إذاعة الشرق الأوسط) established in 1964 as a pan-Arab station
European Program Radio (إذاعة البرنامج الأوربي) broadcasting in English, French, Greek, Italian and German

Specialized (thematic) stations
Cultural Radio (إذاعة البرنامج الثقافي) (replaced The Second Program)
Youth and Sports Radio (إذاعة الشباب والرياضة) (established in 1975)
Radio Greater Cairo (إذاعة القاهرة الكبرى) (established in 1981)
Songs Radio (إذاعة الأغاني) (established in 2000)
News and Music Radio (إذاعة الأخبار والموسيقى)
Radio Masr or Egypt Radio (إذاعة راديو مصر) (established in 2009) 
Al Qur'an al Karim Radio (إذاعة القران الكريم) Muslim religious broadcasting
Educational Radio (الإذاعة التعليمية)
Voice of Palestine (صوت فلسطين)

Regional programming radio stations
North of Saaeed Radio (إذاعة شمال الصعيد)
Nile Valley Radio (إذاعة وادي النيل) 
Middle Delta Radio (إذاعة وسط الدلتا)
Radio Alexandria (إذاعة الإسكندرية)

International stations
Radio Cairo (International) including Radio Cairo World Service 1 to 7 (various channels, shortwave and satellite)

Television

National 
 ERTU 1 (Al Oula) – Generalist and informative programming. It began its broadcasts in 1960.
 ERTU 2 (Al Thanya) – focused on fiction, entertainment and current affairs programming, launched in 1961.
 Al Masriya – Channel aimed at the Egyptian diaspora, available since 1990.
 Channel Egypt

Regional 
There are six state-owned broadcast and satellite channels in Egypt:
 Six regional channels, each providing specialized services for a number of governorates:
Cairo Channel: broadcasting from Cairo and covering Greater Cairo governorates, i.e. Cairo, Giza and Qalioubia.
Alexandria Channel: broadcasting from Alexandria and covering Alexandria, Al Buhayrah and parts of Matrouh.
Canal Channel: broadcasting from Ismailia and covering Suez Canal governorates, i.e. Ismailia, Suez and Port Said.
Delta Channel: broadcasting from Tanta and covering Central Delta governorates, i.e. Al Gharbiyah, Al Minufiyah, Ad Daqahliyah, Kafr ash Shaykh and Dimyat.
Upper Channel: broadcasting from Minya and covering Northern Upper Egypt governorates, i.e. Minya, El-Fayoum, Beni Suef and Asiut.
Thebes Channel: broadcasting from Aswan and covering Southern Upper Egypt governorates, i.e. Suhag, Qena, Al Uqsur and Aswan.

Nile Television 
Nilesat allowed for the launch of several specialized TV channels in addition to Egyptian Satellite Channel (ESC) and Nile TV. All are owned by the Egyptian state.

Specialized channels include:

Al Nile
Nile Culture channel
Nile Comedy channel
Nile Drama channel, specialized in Drama, mainly movies and TV series.
Nile Educational channels, several channels for primary, preparatory, secondary, medical and language education.
Nile Family channel
Nile Sports channel
Nile Variety channel, specialized in various forms of entertainment mainly concerts, music videos, contests and some talk shows.
Tanweer channel

See also
List of radio stations in Egypt

References

External links 

Official website 
 (ERTU Building) 

1971 establishments in Egypt
Publicly funded broadcasters
European Broadcasting Union members
Television stations in Egypt
Arabic-language television stations
Television channels and stations established in 1971
Mass media in Cairo
State media
Government agencies of Egypt